Reuven Helman (1927 - July 11, 2013) was a former Maccabiah Olympian recognized as a weightlifting champion, distinguished athlete in Track and Field, the Decathlon and for his career as an athletic instructor. He competed in shot-put and javelin. Helman came in second in 1957 in the International Maccabiah Games in Tel Aviv, and had also competed in 1953.

Personal life
Helman became an adherent of the Chabad Lubavitch Movement after visiting its spiritual head, Rabbi Menachem M. Schnerson. He attributed his strength to kosher eating, clean living and exercise.

Military service
Helman fought in Israeli's 1948 war of independence and was dubbed the “human cannon” for his ability to fling grenades over 75 meters when army supplies were short. He also received a war medal for his service in World War II.

See also
List of select Jewish weightlifters

References

External links
Photos of Helman

2013 deaths
1927 births
Jewish weightlifters
People from Tel Aviv
Jewish male athletes (track and field)
Israeli soldiers
Maccabiah Games silver medalists for Israel
Israeli male athletes
Maccabiah Games medalists in athletics
Israeli people of the 1948 Arab–Israeli War
Mandatory Palestine military personnel of World War II